Borgorose is a  (municipality) in the Province of Rieti in the Italian region of Lazio, located about  northeast of Rome and about  southeast of Rieti.

Borgorose borders the following municipalities: L'Aquila, Lucoli, Magliano de' Marsi, Pescorocchiano, Sante Marie, Tornimparte. The frazione of Corvaro was the birthplace of Antipope Nicholas V.

Until 1960, the town was denominated Borgocollefegato. Near the town is the ruins of the Romanesque church and crypt of San Giovanni in Leopardis.

References

External links
 Official website

Cities and towns in Lazio